The list contains recipients of the Pour le Mérite military class. Since the foundation, a total of 5,430 persons received this award. The Pour le Mérite was the Kingdom of Prussia's highest military order for officers until the end of World War I. Its equivalent for non-commissioned officers and enlisted men was the Military Merit Cross.

Note: Ranks should be those held at the times of the awarding.

A

B

C

D

E

F

G

H

I

J

K

L

M

N

O

P

Q

R

S

T

U

V

W

X, Y, Z

References 

 Karl-Friedrich Hildebrand/Christian Zweng Die Ritter des Ordens Pour le Mérite 1740-1918; 
 Karl-Friedrich Hildebrand/Christian Zweng Die Ritter des Ordens Pour le Mérite des I. Weltkriegs Band 1: A-G; 
 Karl-Friedrich Hildebrand/Christian Zweng Die Ritter des Ordens Pour le Mérite des I. Weltkriegs Band 2: H-O, 

 
Lists of German military personnel
Lists of German award winners